Derwin F. "Tank" Collins (born January 28, 1969) is a retired American professional basketball player. He played for Presto Ice Cream in the Philippine Basketball Association but is best known for his high school and college careers in the United States.

Early life and high school
A native of Pomona, California, Collins was not athletic as a child and gave up playing sports. When he was in seventh grade, Collins' father suddenly died. His mother forced him to play basketball to distract him from the death during the summer between his seventh and eighth grade years and would even play Tank herself. She would beat him in one-on-one until he became too good, at which point his older brothers began playing physically with Tank. This laid the foundation for his aggressive style which would come to benefit him later.

By the time he got to high school, Collins was utilizing his 6'5" (1.96 m), 215-pound (98 kg) stature to dominate his opponents. He earned the nickname "Tank" from his physique and physicality. One coach said, "He's like a 500-pound gorilla. He can do anything he wants." Collins kept improving, learned to shoot accurately from beyond 15 feet and quickly became one of the most sought-after high school recruits in California.

During his senior year at Pomona High School, however, he was declared academically ineligible to play most of the season due to poor grades. Through his first seven games he had been averaging 28.6 points and 17.1 rebounds per game. Collins claimed that his focus on basketball as well as the attention he was receiving from 100+ college scouts distracted him from concentrating on his classwork. He did manage to play in the final few games of the season, but he had already proven himself enough to college recruiters where it did not affect his desirability to college recruiters.

College and later life
Tank Collins had to play basketball at a junior college for two seasons to improve his grades before he was able to play NCAA Division I basketball. After his brief junior college career, he chose to play basketball for the Privateers of the University of New Orleans (UNO). Between 1989–90 and 1990–91, Collins helped guide UNO to a period of great success. The Privateers won American South Conference (ASC) regular season championships, outright or shared, in both years Collins played. Their season records were:
1989–90 season — 21–11 (8–2 ASC) → co-regular season and ASC conference tournament champions
1990–91 season — 23–8 (9–3 ASC) → co-regular season champions

New Orleans also qualified for NCAA postseason tournaments in each of his two seasons. They earned a berth into the National Invitation Tournament (NIT) in 1990 and advanced to the quarterfinal round. In Collins' senior season he led UNO in scoring with a 17.3 points per game average. They advanced to the 1991 NCAA Tournament but lost to Kansas, 55–49, in the opening round. To conclude his collegiate career, Tank was named the American South Conference Men's Basketball Player of the Year.

After college Collins played in the Philippine Basketball Association for Presto Ice Cream.

References

1969 births
Living people
American expatriate basketball people in the Philippines
American men's basketball players
Bakersfield Jammers players
Basketball players from California
Great Taste Coffee Makers players
New Orleans Privateers men's basketball players
Philippine Basketball Association imports
Power forwards (basketball)
Salt Lake Bruins men's basketball players
Sportspeople from Pomona, California
Yakima Sun Kings players